T-slot structural framing, sometimes known as aluminum extrusion, or 2020 extrusion when the cross-section is 20x20 mm, is a framing system consisting of lengths of square or rectangular extruded aluminum, typically 6105-T5 aluminium alloy, with a T-slot down the centerline of one or more sides. The original design for T-slot structural framing is seen in a 1986 US patent (#4,607,972) by Donald C. Hennick. It is also known as 80/20 framing, after the company 80/20, Inc., one of the prominent T-slot framing brands, the name of which is based on the 80/20 or "Pareto" principle. While there is no published standard defining this framing system, manufacturers have settled into two categories of product comprising several series each that is generally intercompatible across manufacturers.

There is a variation on T-slot profiles known as V-slot rails where V-slot wheels are slotted into the V-shaped channels of the framing for linear motion in a 3d printer or other CNC machine.

Profiles
T-slot framing is divided into metric and fractional (imperial) categories. The T-slot is always centered along the long-axis of the piece. Pieces are available in each series with a square cross-section. Rectangular cross sections are available as well which measure x by 2x (where x is the defined width) - e.g. 40mx80mm for 40 series.

See also 
T-slot nut
Strut channel

References

Structural system